Sidney Williams  (born March 3, 1942) is an American former diplomat and American football linebacker in the National Football League (NFL) for the Cleveland Browns, Washington Redskins, Baltimore Colts, and the Pittsburgh Steelers. He played college football at Southern University.

Early life
Williams was born on March 3, 1942, in Shreveport, Louisiana, and grew up in Houston, Texas. He attended and played high school football at Wheatley High School, graduating in 1959.

College career
Williams attended and played college football at Southern University in Baton Rouge, Louisiana.  Later, he earned a master's degree at Pepperdine University.

Professional career
Williams was drafted in the 16th round (222nd overall) of the 1964 NFL Draft by the Cleveland Browns, where he played from 1964 to 1966, and was a member of the 1964 NFL Champion Browns team.  After a contract dispute with the Browns in 1967, he was traded to the New York Giants in 1967 for a draft selection, but was released a few weeks later.  Williams was then signed by the Washington Redskins, where he played in 1967.  He also played for the Baltimore Colts and the Pittsburgh Steelers.

On June 4, 1967, along with several other Black athletes and one Black political leader, Williams participated in what is now known as the "Cleveland Summit" or the "Muhammad Ali Summit" in Cleveland, Ohio, followed by a press conference, to express support for Muhammad Ali, who was to stand trial for refusing to submit to the military draft.

Sales career
Williams was employed as a sales representative at Mercedes-Benz Hollywood, Inc. in Hollywood, California, from 1979 to 1994.

Political and civil service career
Williams worked as a business developer with the Black Economic Union in Los Angeles, California, and served as a legislative aide for Los Angeles City Councilman David S. Cunningham Jr.  He then served as the United States Ambassador to the Bahamas under the Clinton Administration from 1994 to 1998.

Personal life
Williams is the husband of Representative Maxine Waters, who represents .

References

External links
 

1942 births
Living people
Players of American football from Shreveport, Louisiana
American football linebackers
Southern Jaguars football players
Cleveland Browns players
Washington Redskins players
Baltimore Colts players
Pittsburgh Steelers players
Ambassadors of the United States to the Bahamas